The 1983–84 Washington Huskies men's basketball team represented the University of Washington for the 1983–84 NCAA Division I men's basketball season. Led by thirteenth-year head coach Marv Harshman, the Huskies were members of the Pacific-10 Conference and played their home games on campus at Hec Edmundson Pavilion in Seattle, Washington.

There was no conference tournament this season; it debuted three years later. Nearing the end of the regular season in late February, Harshman's contract was extended for one more year.

Washington made the NCAA tournament for the first time in eight years and was seeded sixth in the West regional of the 53-team field, with the first two rounds at Beasley Coliseum in Pullman.

This year's Final Four was in Seattle at the Kingdome.

Postseason results

|-
!colspan=6 style=| NCAA Tournament

References

External links
Sports Reference – Washington Huskies: 1983–84 basketball season

Washington Huskies men's basketball seasons
Washington Huskies
Washington Huskies
Washington
Washington